Shahpur Dam is located in Attock District on Nandana River in Punjab, Pakistan. With the recent development in the surroundings, the dam has now become a popular picnic spot for locals as well as for the people of nearby cities.

Location
The dam was commissioned by Small Dams Organization, Government of Punjab in 1982 and was completed in 1986 at a cost of PKR 36.5 million.

See also
  List of dams and reservoirs in Pakistan

Notes

Dams in Pakistan
Gravity dams
Dams completed in 1986